Simon Rozgonyi (died March 1414) was a Hungarian nobleman and judge royal, who supported Ladislaus of Naples against Sigismund, Holy Roman Emperor. He had two wives, Anna and Margit, and five children. His son Simon was bishop of Eger (1440–1444) and was killed in the Battle of Varna.

Sources

1414 deaths
Hungarian nobility
Judges royal
Year of birth unknown
Simon